1872 in sports describes the year's events in world sport.

American football
College championship
 College football national championship – Princeton Tigers
Events
 Five teams compete in the 1872 college football season: Columbia, Rutgers, Princeton, Stevens Tech and Yale.

Association football
International
 30 November — Scotland v. England in Glasgow is the first–ever official football international. The match is a goalless draw.

England
 16 March — inaugural FA Cup final. The Wanderers 1–0 Royal Engineers at Kennington Oval in London. The goal is scored by Morton Betts. In its way, this first final marks the beginning of major competitive football.
 The FA rules that the ball must have a circumference of between 68 cm and 71 cm. It must be spherical and must consist of an India rubber bladder enclosed within a casing made of leather or another approved material. Also, the ball must weigh at least 396 grams but no more than 453 grams. The prescribed weight is interesting because leather balls will become notorious for gaining weight when wet: the weight can almost double if the ball gets really soaked.
Scotland
 February — Rangers F.C. is formed in Glasgow by four friends. The team's first pitch is on common land at Flesher's Haugh, Glasgow Green.

Aussie Rules Football
 Essendon Football Club was founded in Victoria, Australia.

Baseball
National championship
 National Association of Professional Base Ball Players champion – Boston Red Stockings
Events
 The National Association (NA) permits pitching with a wrist snap, practically legalising the New York Mutuals.
 Multiple NABBP champions Eckford and Atlantic from Brooklyn, New York join the NA but neither will regain prominence.
 The original Boston Red Stockings win the NA pennant, beginning a four-year run

Boxing
Events
 No fights of note take place in 1872.  American Champion Mike McCoole and his challengers are inactive.

Cricket
Events
 An experiment takes place at Lord's to study the effects of covering the pitch before the start of a match, the first time this is known to have been tried.
England
 Most runs – W. G. Grace 1,485 @ 57.11 (HS 170*)
 Most wickets – James Southerton 169 @ 13.07 (BB 8–20)

Golf
Major tournaments
 British Open – Tom Morris junior

Horse racing
England
 Grand National – Casse Tete
 1,000 Guineas Stakes – Reine
 2,000 Guineas Stakes – Prince Charlie
 The Derby – Cremorne
 The Oaks – Reine
 St. Leger Stakes – Wenlock
Australia
 Melbourne Cup – The Quack
Canada
 Queen's Plate – Fearnaught
Ireland
 Irish Grand National – Scots Grey
 Irish Derby Stakes – Trickstress 
USA
 Belmont Stakes – Joe Daniels

Rowing
The Boat Race
 23 March — Cambridge wins the 29th Oxford and Cambridge Boat Race

Rugby football
Events
 Wigan RLFC founded

References

Bibliography
 Rowland Bowen, Cricket: A History of its Growth and Development, Eyre & Spottiswoode, 1970

 
Sports by year